Zhejiang University Press (traditional Chinese: 浙江大學出版社; simplified Chinese: 浙江大学出版社) is the official press of Zhejiang University (People's Republic of China).

Established in 1984, Zhejiang University Press publishes on diverse subjects and covers areas of natural sciences, engineering and technology, the humanities and social sciences, medicine and life sciences. It publishes monographs, textbooks for teachers and students, professional and trade books, and art albums. In recent years, the press has established close partnerships with publishers outside China, such as Springer Science+Business Media, Elsevier, WSPC, Cengage, Oxford University Press, Cambridge University Press, and McGraw-Hill.

External links
 

Publishing companies established in 1984
University presses of China
Mass media in Hangzhou
Companies associated with Zhejiang University